Wallens Ridge State Prison is a level 5 state prison located in Big Stone Gap, Virginia, housing approximately 700 inmates. Since opening in April 1999, it has been a part of the Virginia Department of Corrections, and is identical to the Red Onion State Prison near Pound. The prison was built for over $70 million. As of 1999 the prison employs almost 800 people.

See also

References

External links
 Virginia Department of Corrections Facilities
 Stun gun cited in state prisoner's death at Wallens Ridge
 $750,000 settlement for prison suicide

1999 establishments in Virginia
Buildings and structures in Wise County, Virginia
Prisons in Virginia
Supermax prisons